Macrosporium is a genus of fungi belonging to the family Pleosporaceae.

The genus has almost cosmopolitan distribution.

Species

Species:

Macrosporium abruptum 
Macrosporium abutilonis 
Macrosporium agaves

References

Pleosporaceae
Dothideomycetes genera